The northern ravine salamander (Plethodon electromorphus) is a species of salamander in the family Plethodontidae endemic to the United States. It has been found in Indiana, Ohio, Kentucky, Pennsylvania and West Virginia. Its natural habitats are temperate forests and rocky areas. The species is listed as Least Concern on the IUCN Red List of Threatened Species.

Description  
The northern ravine salamander is a small terrestrial salamander, 7.5 – 11.5 cm (3.0 – 4.5 in) in total length. They are elongated, slender, and short-legged. Their coloration is brown to nearly black, sprinkled with minute silvery white and bronzy or brassy specks. They have very small, irregular white blotches on lower sides, and a virtually plain dark belly with a lightly mottled chin.

Taxonomy 
Previously considered to be a part of Plethodon richmondi (southern ravine salamanders), electrophoresis, from which the name electromorphus is derived, was used to distinguish them.

Behavior 
Northern ravine salamanders are less aggressive than the more widespread Plethodon cinereus (red-backed salamander).

References

Plethodon
Amphibians of the United States
Amphibians described in 1999
Taxonomy articles created by Polbot